The 1983 South Carolina Gamecocks football team represented the University of South Carolina as an independent during the 1983 NCAA Division I-A football season. Led by second-year head coach Joe Morrison, the Gamecocks compiled a record of 5–6.

Schedule

References

South Carolina
South Carolina Gamecocks football seasons
South Carolina Gamecocks football